Cornerstone Christian Academy (CCA) is a coeducational, non-denominational, private Christian school serving grades K-12, in Willoughby Hills, Ohio.

Mission statement
To provide a quality education based on God's Truth, resulting in Christ-like students who will impact their world for the glory of God.

Education Philosophy
Cornerstone Christian Academy utilizes a living curriculum, through its teachers, in which the Word of God governs and informs every subject. CCA also provides a Godly example for each child, assisting parents in the fulfillment of the God-given mandate to “bring them (their children) up in the training and instruction of the Lord.” Ephesians 6:4

Athletics 
Soccer - Lower School and Middle School (coed), JV and Varsity teams for both boys and girls
Volleyball - Middle School, JV, and Varsity (girls)
Golf - Varsity (boys)
Basketball  -Lower School (Co-ed), Middle School, JV, and Varsity teams for boys and girls 
Cheerleading - Varsity (girls)
Track and field - Middle School and Varsity (coed)
Baseball - Middle School and Varsity (boys)
Fastpitch softball - Middle School, JV, and Varsity (girls)

The high school boys varsity basketball team won the Division IV State Championship in 2016.  The final score was 72–54, against Van Wert Lincolnview.

Co-Curriculars 
Spelling Bee
Math Olympics
Art Show
Speech Meet
Power of the Pen
Mock Trial
Ski Club

External links
 School Website

References 

Christian schools in Ohio
High schools in Lake County, Ohio
Private high schools in Ohio
Private middle schools in Ohio
Private elementary schools in Ohio
Educational institutions established in 1999
1999 establishments in Ohio